Liljeblad is a Swedish and Finnish surname and may refer to:

Emil Liljeblad (1876–1937), Finnish missionary and folkloristics researcher
Joni Liljeblad (born 1989), Finnish ice hockey player
Samuel Liljeblad (1761-1815), Swedish botanist and mycologist

Surnames of Finnish origin